The positive energy theorem (also known as the positive mass theorem) refers to a collection of foundational results in general relativity and differential geometry. Its standard form, broadly speaking, asserts that the gravitational energy of an isolated system is nonnegative, and can only be zero when the system has no gravitating objects. Although these statements are often thought of as being primarily physical in nature, they can be formalized as mathematical theorems which can be proven using techniques of differential geometry, partial differential equations, and geometric measure theory.

Richard Schoen and Shing-Tung Yau, in 1979 and 1981, were the first to give proofs of the positive mass theorem. Edward Witten, in 1982, gave the outlines of an alternative proof, which were later filled in rigorously by mathematicians. Witten and Yau were awarded the Fields medal in mathematics in part for their work on this topic.

An imprecise formulation of the Schoen-Yau / Witten positive energy theorem states the following:

The meaning of these terms is discussed below. There are alternative and non-equivalent formulations for different notions of energy-momentum and for different classes of initial data sets. Not all of these formulations have been rigorously proven, and it is currently an open problem whether the above formulation holds for initial data sets of arbitrary dimension.

Historical overview
The original proof of the theorem for ADM mass was provided by Richard Schoen and Shing-Tung Yau in 1979 using variational methods and minimal surfaces.  Edward Witten gave another proof in 1981 based on the use of spinors, inspired by positive energy theorems in the context of supergravity.  An extension of the theorem for the Bondi mass was given by Ludvigsen and James Vickers, Gary Horowitz and Malcolm Perry, and Schoen and Yau.

Gary Gibbons, Stephen Hawking, Horowitz and Perry proved extensions of the theorem to asymptotically anti-de Sitter spacetimes and to Einstein–Maxwell theory.  The mass of an asymptotically anti-de Sitter spacetime is non-negative and only equal to zero for anti-de Sitter spacetime. In Einstein–Maxwell theory, for a spacetime with electric charge  and magnetic charge , the mass of the spacetime satisfies (in Gaussian units)

with equality for the Majumdar–Papapetrou extremal black hole solutions.

Initial data sets
One says that an initial data set :
 is time-symmetric if  is zero
 is maximal if  
 satisfies the dominant energy condition if
 

This definition is motivated from Lorentzian geometry. The triple  is an initial data set. According to the Gauss-Codazzi equations, one has

The ends of asymptotically flat initial data sets
In the literature there are several different notions of "asymptotically flat" which are not mutually equivalent. Usually it is defined in terms of weighted Hölder spaces or weighted Sobolev spaces.

However, there are some features which are common to virtually all approaches. One considers an initial data set  which may or may not have a boundary; let  denote its dimension. One requires that there is a compact subset  of  such that each connected component of the complement  is diffeomorphic to the complement of a closed ball in Euclidean space .

Formal statements

Schoen and Yau (1979) 
Let  be a time-symmetric initial data set satisfying the dominant energy condition. Suppose that  is an oriented three-dimensional smooth Riemannian manifold-with-boundary, and that each boundary component has positive mean curvature. Suppose that it has one end, and it is asymptotically Schwarzschild in the following sense:

Schoen and Yau's theorem asserts that  must be nonnegative.

This can be interpreted in a purely mathematical sense as a strong form of "asymptotically flat", where the coefficient of the  part of the expansion of the metric is declared to be a constant multiple of the Euclidean metric, as opposed to a general symmetric 2-tensor.

Note also that Schoen and Yau's theorem, as stated above, is actually (despite appearances) a strong form of the "multiple ends" case. If  is a complete Riemannian manifold with multiple ends, then the above result applies to any single end, provided that there is a positive mean curvature sphere in every other end. This is guaranteed, for instance, if each end is asymptotically flat in the above sense; one can choose a large coordinate sphere as a boundary, and remove the corresponding remainder of each end until one has a Riemannian manifold-with-boundary with a single end.

Schoen and Yau (1981) 
Let  be an initial data set satisfying the dominant energy condition. Suppose that  is an oriented three-dimensional smooth complete Riemannian manifold (without boundary); suppose that it has finitely many ends, each of which is asymptotically flat in the following sense.

Suppose that  is an open precompact subset such that  has finitely many connected components  and for each  there is a diffeomorphism  such that the symmetric 2-tensor  satisfies the following conditions:
Also suppose that
  is bounded.
The conclusion is that the ADM energy of each  defined as
 
is nonnegative. Furthermore, supposing in addition that

Witten (1981) 
Let  be an oriented three-dimensional smooth complete Riemannian manifold (without boundary). Let  be a smooth symmetric 2-tensor on  such that
 
Suppose that  is an open precompact subset such that  has finitely many connected components  and for each  there is a diffeomorphism  such that the symmetric 2-tensor  satisfies the following conditions:
For each  define the ADM energy and linear momentum by
 
 
For each  consider this as a vector  in Minkowski space. Witten's conclusion is that for each  it is necessarily a future-pointing non-spacelike vector.

Extensions and remarks 
According to the above statements, Witten's conclusion is stronger than Schoen and Yau's.
1979 result, which is proved by contradiction; therefore their extension of their 1981 result is also by contradiction. By contrast, Witten's proof is logically direct, exhibiting the ADM energy directly as a nonnegative quantity. Furthermore, Witten's proof in the case  can be extended without much effort to higher-dimensional manifolds, under the topological condition that the manifold admits a spin structure. Schoen and Yau's 1979 result and proof can be extended to the case of any dimension less than eight. More recently, Witten's result, using Schoen and Yau (1981)'s methods, has been extended to the same context. In summary: following Schoen and Yau's methods, the positive energy theorem has been proven in dimension less than eight, while following Witten, it has been proven in any dimension but with a restriction to the setting of spin manifolds.

As of April 2017, Schoen and Yau have released a preprint which proves the general higher-dimensional case in the special case  without any restriction on dimension or topology. However, it has not yet (as of May 2020) appeared in an academic journal.

Applications 
 In 1984 Schoen used the positive mass theorem in his work which completed the solution of the Yamabe problem.
 The positive mass theorem was used in Hubert Bray's proof of the Riemannian Penrose inequality.

References 

 
 
 
 
 
 
 
Textbooks
 Choquet-Bruhat, Yvonne. General relativity and the Einstein equations. Oxford Mathematical Monographs. Oxford University Press, Oxford, 2009. xxvi+785 pp. 
 Wald, Robert M. General relativity. University of Chicago Press, Chicago, IL, 1984. xiii+491 pp. 

Mathematical methods in general relativity
Theorems in general relativity